Dave Bonawits (or David Bonawits) is an American actor, filmmaker, and editor. He was one of the hosts of FishCenter Live, from the show's start on Adult Swim's website in 2014 to its cancellation in 2020.

Career 
Bonawits directed Pleasant People (2011). In 2011, Pleasant People had its world premiere at the 2011 Slamdance Film Festival. He also edited the 2015 film Female Pervert. He is also Jiyoung Lee's creative partner.

While working at Adult Swim, he hosted the American web television series FishCenter Live alongside Andrew Choe, Matt Harrigan, Christina Loranger, and Max Simonet. The show ran from 2014 to 2020, ending following layoffs, which included Dave. During that time, Dave Bonawits also hosted a crossword solving show with Max Simonet for Adult Swim from 2015 to 2020, which later became known as Bloodfeast. Bloodfeast later received two animated television spin-offs, Tender Touches and Gēmusetto, with Dave co-creating the former and voice acting in both.

Bonawits is also the bassist for the band Antbrain.

Filmography

See also 
List of talk show hosts

References

External links
 
 

American television producers
American television talk show hosts
American television writers
American male voice actors
Living people
American male television writers
Place of birth missing (living people)
Year of birth missing (living people)